KPPS-LP (97.5 FM) is a radio station licensed to St. Louis Park, Minnesota, United States.  The station is currently owned by Park Public Radio, Inc.

The station left the air on February 7, 2023 the day after the FCC denied PPR’s petition for reconsideration of the dismissal of its application to move to a different transmitter site. In its request for special temporary authority to remain silent, KPPS-LP states that a harsh winter has caused further deterioration of its transmission system and that the antenna will need to be removed for building repairs.

References

External links
 

Radio stations in Minnesota
Low-power FM radio stations in Minnesota
Radio stations established in 2016
2016 establishments in Minnesota